Patricio Herman Fernández Chadwick (born 21 September 1969) is a Chilean lawyer who was elected as a member of the Chilean Constitutional Convention.

He was the founder of The Clinic newspaper.

References

External links

Living people
1969 births
Chilean journalists
21st-century Chilean politicians
Pontifical Catholic University of Chile alumni
University of Florence alumni
Members of the Chilean Constitutional Convention
People from Santiago
20th-century Chilean lawyers